Siemsen is a surname. Notable people with the surname include:

 Hans Siemsen (1891–1969), German writer and journalist
 Remy Siemsen (born 1999), Australian soccer player

See also
 Siemens (surname)